Bauhinia variegata is a species of flowering plant in the legume family, Fabaceae. It is native to an area from China through Southeast Asia to the Indian subcontinent. Common names include orchid tree (though not belonging to the family Orchidaceae) and mountain ebony.

Description

The leaves are  obcordate shaped, long and broad, rounded, and bilobed at the base and apex. The flowers are conspicuous, bright pink or white,  diameter, with five petals. Pollens are elongated, approximately 75 microns in length.

The seedpod dries completely on the tree, and when mature begins to twist into a helix or corkscrew shape, (see below), ultimately exploding open—with a very audible "clack"—to deliver its seeds into the environs.

The anatomy of the stem was studied by taking transverse section. Periderm and cortex were seen distinctly. Secondary phloem was wide and continuous cylindrical, it consisted of thin and narrow straight rays, three or four cylinders of discontinuous masses of fibres and randomly distributed sieve elements. Secondary xylem was diffuse porous and it included vessels, fibres, xylem rays and xylem parenchyma. Xylem fibres had thick lignified walls or some had gelatinous walls. Xylem parenchyma cells were abundant in the xylem. Xylem rays were one cell wide; they were straight and consisted of radially elongated thick walled lignified walls. Calcium-oxalate crystals are predominantly prismatic crystals and druses type. Powder microscopical examination showed presence of fibres, parenchymatous cells, periderm and vessel elements. Histochemical analysis of stem showed presence of protein, tannin, lignin and cellulose.

The anatomy of the root was studied by taking transverse section. Secondary phloem and secondary xylem were seen distinctly. Secondary phloem had fairly wide rays, dense masses of phloem fibers and radial rows of phloem elements. Secondary xylem had much wider, thin-walled vessels which were either solitary or in radial multiples. The xylem fibers constituted gelatinous type and normal type. Calcium oxalate crystals were predominantly prismatic type. Powder microscopical examination showed presence of xylem parenchyma cells, xylem fibers and vessel elements.

In cultivation
This is a very popular ornamental tree in subtropical and tropical climates, grown for its scented flowers and also used as a food item in Indian cuisine. In the Neotropics, it can be used to attract hummingbirds—such as sapphire-spangled emerald (Amazilia lactea), glittering-bellied emerald (Chlorostilbon lucidus), or white-throated hummingbird (Leucochloris albicollis)—into gardens and parks. On the other hand, in some areas it has become naturalised and invasive.

Uses
Kachnar is a local name in the Indian subcontinent for the edible buds collected from the tree; it is widely used as an ingredient in many subcontinent recipes. Traditional kachnar curry is prepared using kachnar buds, yogurt, onions and native spices. Kachnar buds are also eaten as a stir-fried vegetable and used to make achaar, a pickle in many parts of the Indian sub-continent. It shows a good antioxidant and anticancer activity.

In Nepal, the plant is known as koiralo and the flower is known as koiralo ko phool in Nepali language. The flower and the buds are used to make Nepalese style achaar. The flowers and buds are boiled for a while and then mixed with roughly mashed boiled potato, chopped green chilies, chopped onions, fresh peas, coriander leaves and spices like timmur,  salt, pepper, turmeric powder, roasted sesame powder (til ko chhop), cumin powder and coriander powder. Heated mustard oil and fenugreek seeds is then added to the mixture and then lemon juice or lime juice concentrate (chuk amilo in Nepali) is then added as per taste. The achar is then served instantly. The achar is important part of the meal served during the Ghode Jatra festival.

Gallery

References

External links
Bauhinia variegata in West African plants – A Photo Guide.

Invasive Species South Africa

variegata
Flora of China
Flora of the Indian subcontinent
Flora of Indo-China
Garden plants of Asia
Ornamental trees
Plants described in 1753
Taxa named by Carl Linnaeus
Trees in Buddhism
Symbols of Bihar